The Trojans Rugby Football Club is an under-nineteen-year-old rugby club originally based out of Lassiter High School. It is one of the original high school rugby clubs which are part of the Georgia High School Rugby Association (GHSRA). The club was founded in 2005, and has made its mark on rugby in Georgia. Matches and practices are held at Noonday Creek Park in Marietta. Coach Randall Joseph has been the head coach since the club's founding, with John Green, Winston Daniels and Michael Murrell as assistant coaches. The club has taken park in many tournaments and state final matches in Georgia and the Southeast United States.  A major goal of the Trojans Rugby Football Club is to teach and play the sport of rugby in the United States. This is a great struggle throughout Georgia because of opposition from the high school's football coaches and athletic directors. The club plays the most common version of rugby, called rugby union but often just referred to as rugby. Although the club plays by rugby union rules, they also play by the rules of the International Rugby Board (IRB) for those under 19 years of age. In the summer of 2011, the Trojan Rugby Football Club took part in another version of rugby called rugby sevens. This variation of rugby is faster paced, with the same size fields but fewer people, and shorter half lengths.

Location, practices and games
Noonday Creek Park serves as the Trojans Rugby Football Club's home pitch. Although Lassiter High School is associated with the Trojans Rugby Football Club they do not permit the club to use fields at the school. Noonday Creek Park is located off Shallowford Rd., and at 489 Hawkins Store Rd., NE, Kennesaw, GA, 30144. The park has been part of high school rugby in Georgia since the first game was played there on March 4, 2005. Most practices and all home games for the Trojans take place at this park. Although Fall is the off season, practices currently occur every Wednesday at 4:45pm on field 13. During the formal spring season practices are held on Tuesdays and Thursdays at 5pm and games are typically played on Friday nights.  When the park is closed, practices are held on the field at McCleskey Middle School, located at 4080 Maybreeze Road Marietta, Georgia, 30066.

History
The Trojans Rugby Football Club began as one of the first three high school rugby teams in Georgia, in 2005. To create these teams the coaches got together and used the graduate thesis, "The Bryant Model." This graduate thesis was written by Phillip C. Bryant, MBA, to provide a manual to starting a high school rugby club. After the first year the Trojans Rugby Football Club had earned a State Championship title for beating Pope High School's team 23-19. By the next season in 2006, the Georgia High School Rugby Association had created two divisions due to the increase in teams. The Trojan Rugby Football Club was placed in the Cobb County Division along with the Pope High School, the Sequoyah High School, and the Campbell High School Rugby Football Clubs. In the 2006 season, the Trojan Rugby Football Club lost all of their games to the other teams in the Cobb County Division. The club entered the 2007 season with growing numbers of new competition and notable performance. At the season's end the Trojans Rugby Football Club had an 11-1 record with the one loss coming from a defeat in the Southeast Tournament, by the Rummel Raiders Rugby Club of New Orleans, Louisiana. The club earned a second State Championship title after defeating the Alpharetta Phoenix Rugby Football Club, and participated in its first Southeast Tournament. In 2008, the club added to their success with yet another State Championship title and traveled to Nashville, Tennessee to play in the 2008 Southeast Tournament. The State Championship match was won in over time against the Alpharetta Phoenix Rugby Football Club with a final score of 17-15. For the second year in a row, the Trojans finished with an 11-1 record, only losing in the Southeast Championship Final match to the Jesuit High School Rugby Club from New Orleans, Louisiana. The 2009 and 2010 carried on their winning traditions by finishing those seasons undefeated in state play, due to Phoenix playing illegal players who were over the age limits during the 2009 and 2010 state title games. In the 2010 season, the Trojans passed up the opportunity to play for the Southeast title and allowed Phoenix to go in their place, Phoenix eventually moved to Nationals. In 2011 the Trojans again took the Georgia Rugby State Champion title from Alpharetta Phoenix. The Trojan Rugby Football Club ended their 2011 spring regular season 8-0 and beat Phoenix Club 55-14 in the State Championship match at Walton High School. The Trojans attended the Southeast Championship in Sanford, Florida the weekend of April 30, 2011. Out of all of the teams attending, the Trojans were seated first overall for the tournament. The morning of Saturday, April 30 the Trojans won their first match against Brother Martin, from Louisiana, 27-0. Later that day the Trojans suffered their first loss of 2011 against Raleigh Rattlesnakes, from North Carolina, 12-26. On Sunday the Trojans lost their final match to the Tampa Barbarians, from Florida, 5-18, earning themselves the sixth-place position of the tournament. In 2016, the Trojans combined with local Pope and Walton high school rugby teams to form "East Cobb Rugby Club".

Record
Trojans Rugby Football Club Record: 51 matches won and 6 matches lost with no draws. Along with a winning streak against competition inside the state of GA stretching from 2006-2011. Updated on 27 September 2011.

Notable players
Hanno Dirksen
 Position: Fly Half (10), Center (12, 13), Wing (11, 14)
 Teams: U17 USA team, St. Ives, Cornwall Men's team, Ospreys
 Honors: Selected to play for the Under 17 age USA team in 2008. Contracted to the Ospreys

Notes and references

Rugby union teams in Georgia (U.S. state)